Robert Anthony Rydon (born 27 November 1964) is an English former first-class cricketer.

Rydon was born in November 1964 at Greatham, Sussex. He was educated at Sherborne School, before going up to Pembroke College, Oxford. While studying at Oxford, Russell played first-class cricket for Oxford University in 1986 and 1987, making six appearances. Rydon scored 72 runs in his six matches, with a high score of 20. With his right-arm medium pace bowling, he took 6 wickets at an expensive average of 86.33 and best figures of 3 for 106.

After graduating from Oxford, Rydon became an investment manager. He began his career at James Capel Investment Management, before joining Merrill Lynch. He joined Cazenove in 2010 as a portfolio director.

References

External links

1964 births
Living people
People from Horsham District
People educated at Sherborne School
Alumni of Pembroke College, Oxford
English cricketers
Oxford University cricketers
English investors